is a railway station on the Hisatsu Line in Kirishima, Kagoshima, Japan, operated by Kyushu Railway Company (JR Kyushu). The station opened in 1957.

Lines
Uemura Station is served by the Hisatsu Line.

Adjacent stations

Surrounding area
Kagoshima Prefectural Road Route 50
Amori River
Yokogawa Onsen

See also
 List of railway stations in Japan

External links

  

Railway stations in Japan opened in 1957
Railway stations in Kagoshima Prefecture